Federal Highway 190D is the tolled Federal Highway that parallels Federal Highway 190. Highways with the 190D signage are in the states of Oaxaca and Chiapas.

Oaxaca: Autopista Mitla-Tehuantepec

The westernmost segment of Highway 190D, numbered for the first time in 2017, is currently under construction. It will serve as a major transportation backbone connecting the Isthmus region of the state to the capital of Oaxaca de Juárez. The concession for the  highway was initially held by the Autovía unit of Empresas ICA but sold to IDEAL, a Carlos Slim company, in February 2017 after ICA entered into financial trouble, along with the concession to operate the Túnel Diamante in Acapulco.

Highway 190D currently exists as two unconnected roads. The western segment connects San Pablo Villa Mitla to Santa María Albarradas. The eastern segment of  opened in March 2016 and connects Mexico Federal Highway 185D, the bypass of the Istmo region, to Santiago Lachiguiri.

When complete, this highway will have 66 bridges and three tunnels, and it will provide an estimated time savings of two hours compared to Mexico Federal Highway 190 along the same route.

Chiapas: Ocozocuautla-Arriaga

Officially Highway 200D exists but signed as 190D throughout its route to match its sister highway, the highway from Ocozocuautla to Arriaga and is one of the two segments signed as Highway 190D in Chiapas and operated by Concesionaria de Autopistas del Sureste, S.A. de C.V. The toll for the entire course for an automobile is 146 pesos through four toll zones. It was inaugurated on August 8, 2010.

Chiapas: Tuxtla Gutiérrez-San Cristóbal de las Casas

CAS also operates the highway between Tuxtla Gutiérrez and San Cristóbal de las Casas, the two major cities in central Chiapas. The toll for the entire route is 50 pesos. It opened on May 15, 2006.

References

External links
CAS

Mexican Federal Highways